Triunia erythrocarpa, or spice bush, is a shrub of the family Proteaceae native to Queensland.

References

Flora of Queensland
erythrocarpa
Plants described in 1987